Reflection map may refer to:

 Reflection mapping in computer graphics
 A reflection (mathematics), specifically
 an element of a reflection group
 an element of a Weyl group
 Reflection map (logic optimization), a conventional Gray code Karnaugh map in logic optimization